Thomson may refer to:

Names 
 Thomson (surname), a list of people with this name and a description of its origin
 Thomson baronets, four baronetcies created for persons with the surname Thomson

Businesses and organizations 
 SGS-Thomson Microelectronics, a electronics manufacturer
 Various travel subsidiaries of TUI Group:
 Thomson Airways (now TUI Airways), a UK-based airline
 Thomson Cruises (now Marella Cruises), a UK-based cruise line
 Thomson Holidays (now TUI UK), a UK-based travel company 
 Thomsonfly, a former UK airline, formerly Britannia Airways
Thomson Directories, local business search company and publisher of:
Thomson Local, the UK business directory
Thomson Multimedia, former name of Technicolor SA, a French multinational corporation
 Thomson Reuters, Canadian media and information services company
 Thomson Corporation, former name of the company prior to its 2008 merger with Reuters
 Thomson Financial, former business division of Thomson
 Thomson Healthcare, former healthcare division of Thomson
 Thomson Scientific, former research division of Thomson
Technicolor SA, formerly known as Thomson SARL and Thomson Multimedia, a French electronics manufacturer and media services provider
Thomson-CSF, former name for the Thales Group
Thomsons Online Benefits, a UK-based provider of employee benefit programmes
L.H. Thomson, manufacturer of aircraft and bicycle parts

Places 
 Thomson (crater), a lunar impact crater in the Mare Ingenii on the far side of the Moon

Australia
Thomson Dam
Thomson River (Queensland)
Thomson River (Victoria)
Thomson, Victoria a suburb of Geelong

Canada
David and Mary Thomson Collegiate Institute, a high school located in Toronto, Ontario

Singapore
Thomson, Singapore, a neighborhood in Singapore
Thomson Road, Singapore, a major trunk road
Thomson MRT Line, a mass transit line

United States
 Thomson, Georgia
 Thomson, Illinois
 Thomson Correctional Center
 Thomson, Minnesota
 Thomson Dam (Minnesota)
 Thomson, New York

Science and technology 
Joule–Thomson effect, temperature change of a fluid passing through a valve in a thermally insulated system
thomson (unit), a unit for mass-to-charge ratio, symbol: Th
Thomson structures, synonym for Widmanstätten patterns
Thomson, abbreviation used to indicate Thomas Thomson when citing a botanical name
Thomson cubic, the locus of centers of circumconics of a triangle
Thomson effect, the heating or cooling of a current-carrying conductor in a temperature gradient
Thomson's gazelle, a species of gazelle
Thomson MO5, MO6, TO7, TO8, microcomputers made by Thomson SA in the 1980s
Thomson problem, 
Thomson scattering, the elastic scattering of electromagnetic radiation by a free charged particle

See also
 Thomson Reservoir (disambiguation)
 Thompson (disambiguation)
 Thomsen
 Thomason (disambiguation)